Amanda and the Alien (or Alien Love in the United Kingdom) is a 1995 made-for-cable science fiction comedy film directed by Jon Kroll and starring Nicole Eggert as Amanda Patterson. It premiered on Showtime on August 20, 1995.

Background
Amanda and the Alien is based upon the short story of the same name written by Robert Silverberg.

Premise
Amanda Patterson, a typical Gen X girl and employee at an upscale clothing store, is leading a relatively lonely and unremarkable life. All this changes when an alien that's been held at a secret military installation escapes by taking over the body of one of the base employees. Amanda finds the fugitive alien and decides to help him hide from the government agents chasing him, a seemingly easy task, as the alien must change host bodies every few days.

Cast
 John Diehl
 Michael Dorn
 Stacy Keach
 David Millbern
 Dan O'Connor
 Raymond D. Turner
 Alex Meneses
 J. Marvin Campbell
 Nicole Eggert
 Richard Speight Jr.

Reception
The New York Daily News criticized Eggert's acting and wrote that the film "wastes so much time deciding whether it wants to steal from Life-force, Starman, Species or Earth Girls Are Easy that it goes nowhere fast."

References

External links
 
 

1990s English-language films
1995 television films
1995 films
1990s science fiction comedy films
American science fiction comedy films
American science fiction television films
I.R.S. Media films
1990s American films